Sturgeon Lake is a lake on Sauvie Island in the U.S. state of Oregon.  It is particularly notable in that it is the largest lake on the largest fluvial island in the United States and occupies quite a large area of that island.

References

Lakes of Oregon
Sauvie Island